Dundee St James are a Scottish football club from the Mid-Craigie area in the east of Dundee. They are members of the East Region of the Scottish Junior Football Association and currently play in the Midlands Football League

History

The club originally played amateur football in the Midlands Amateur Football Association under the name Fintry Amateurs, but joined the Scottish Junior Football Association in 2021, changing their name to Dundee St James. Their home ground is Fairfield Park, previously known as Midmill Park, former home of now-defunct club Elmwood.

References

Football clubs in Scotland
Scottish Junior Football Association clubs
Association football clubs established in 2021
St James FC
2021 establishments in Scotland